One More Time is a 2016 South Korean web series starring Kim Myung-soo and Yoon So-hee. It was released exclusively on Netflix on March 10, 2017.

Plot 
Yoo Tan is the leader and vocalist of an indie band called One More Time, which he started with his childhood friends. As the band’s popularity and revenue begins to dwindle, Tan decides to sign a contract with a music label. While adjusting to his new life, Tan gets swept up in a mysterious event – An unwanted time leap allows him to journey back in time to regain his girlfriend.

Cast

Main

Supporting

Episodes

See also 
 List of original programs distributed by Netflix
 List of South Korean dramas

References 

2016 web series debuts
2016 web series endings
Korean-language television shows